Stars on Ice was a weekly television ice show, broadcast from 1976 to 1981 on the CTV Television Network in Canada. The series was hosted by Alex Trebek (1976–1980) and later, Doug Crosley (1980–1981), and featured skaters such as Toller Cranston. The program was produced on an ice rink set up at Studio 6 of CFTO-TV in Toronto.

The series was produced and directed by Michael Steele, had a regular cast of 14 world-class ice professionals, most of whom lived and taught skating locally in and around Toronto. The variety show format on ice consisted of a glitzy "show opener" by the regular cast of skaters and a bigger budget production number (usually tributes to Hollywood musicals) with elaborate set pieces in the middle of the half-hour.

Rounding out the half-hour were famous and novelty-act figure skaters, vaudeville-type acts, and "affordable" (on the series' modest budget) non-skating celebrities at the B-list phase of their careers, such as Davy Jones and Micky Dolenz formerly of The Monkees, Eddie Mekka of Laverne & Shirley, and 1960s recording artist Donovan.

Due to being only minimally dependent on language, and its unusual ice/variety show format, the series went on to be widely syndicated throughout the world.

This television series is unrelated to the later traveling ice show tour, Stars on Ice.

References

External links

CTV Television Network original programming
1970s Canadian variety television series
1980s Canadian variety television series
1976 Canadian television series debuts
1981 Canadian television series endings
Ice shows
Figure skating on television